Karat (also Romanized as Karāt; also known as Kārt) is a village in Karat Rural District, in the Central District of Taybad County, Razavi Khorasan Province, Iran. As of the 2006 census, its population was 950, in 191 families.

References 

Populated places in Taybad County